Carintana dalle Carceri (died in 1255) was the co-ruler of Oreus and the northern third or  of the Lordship of Negroponte in Frankish Greece in circa 1240-1255. She was the second wife of William of Villehardouin, Prince of Achaea. Her childless death gave rise to the War of the Euboeote Succession involving Venice and most rulers of Frankish Greece. Carintana dalle Carceri was born into the family of Rizzardo dalle  Carceri Griarch of Eboea in the year 1220. She was the second (2nd) wife of Guillaume 2nd 'Le grande Dero de Villehardouin, Prince of Achaia.

References

Sources 

Princesses of Achaea
Triarchs of Negroponte
Carintana
13th-century people from the Principality of Achaea
1220 births
1255 deaths